The 2012 KNVB Cup Final was a football match between PSV Eindhoven and Heracles Almelo that took place on 8 April 2012 at De Kuip, Rotterdam. It was the final match of the 2011–12 KNVB Cup competition and the 94th Dutch Cup final.

PSV Eindhoven beat Heracles Almelo 3–0 and won their 9th and most recent KNVB Cup trophy.

This match was also Heracles Almelo's first and only appearance in a KNVB Cup final in their club's entire history.

Route to the final

Match

Details

References 

2012
2011–12 in Dutch football
PSV Eindhoven matches
April 2012 sports events in Europe
Sports competitions in Rotterdam
21st century in Rotterdam
Heracles Almelo